Ceratrichia wollastoni is a species of butterfly in the family Hesperiidae. It is found in Cameroon, the Republic of the Congo, the Democratic Republic of the Congo, Uganda, western Kenya and north-western Tanzania. The habitat consists of forests.

References

Butterflies described in 1909
Hesperiinae